Walter Fitzgerald Bond (18 May 1896 – 20 December 1976) was an English character actor.

Early life
Born in Stoke, Plymouth, Fitzgerald was a former stockbroker before he began his theatrical training at RADA. He joined the British Army during World War I, serving with the Worcestershire Regiment, the Devonshire Regiment, and the Somerset Light Infantry.

Career
Fitzgerald made his professional stage bow in 1922 and his first film appearance in 1930.

He toured with Sir John Martin-Harvey and Sir Seymour Hicks. He was understudy to Sir Gerald du Maurier (1928–29).
Fitzgerald appeared in films from the 1930s, often in 'official' roles (policemen, doctors, lawyers). He appeared on British television in the 1950s and 1960s before his retirement. His best-remembered film roles include Simon Fury in Blanche Fury (1948), Dr. Fenton in The Fallen Idol (1948), and Squire Trelawney in Treasure Island (1950). In the opening scenes of H.M.S. Defiant (1962) he played the admiral who listens to – and then disregards – Captain Crawford's complaints about maritime cruelty.

Personal life
He married Rosalie Constance Grey in 1924. 
They had one son, Michael Lewis Fitzgerald-Bond.
His second marriage was to Angela Kirk in 1938, and they had three sons (Jonathan, Timothy, and Charles) and one daughter (Julia).

Filmography

 Murder at Covent Garden (1932) – Donald Walpace
 The Show Goes On (1937) – Soldier with His Family on Troopship (uncredited)
 This England (1941) – Vicar
 In Which We Serve (1942) – Colonel Lumsden
 Squadron Leader X (1943) – Inspector Milne
 San Demetrio London (1943) – Chief Engineer Charles Pollard
 Strawberry Roan (1945) – Walter Morley
 Great Day (1945) – Bob Tyndale
 Mine Own Executioner (1947) – Dr. Norris Pile
 This Was a Woman (1948) – Arthur Russell
 Blanche Fury (1948) – Simon Fury
 The Fallen Idol (1948) – Dr. Fenton
 The Winslow Boy (1948) – First Lord
 The Small Back Room (1949) – Brine
 Edward, My Son (1949) – Mr. Kedner
 Treasure Island (1950) – Squire Trelawney
 Flesh and Blood (1951) – Dr. Cooper
 The Pickwick Papers (1952) – Mr. Wardle
 The Ringer (1952) – Commissioner
 The Net (1953) – Sir Charles Craddock
 Appointment in London (1953) – Mulvaney
 The Cruel Sea (1953) – Warden (uncredited)
 Twice Upon a Time (1953) – Professor Reynolds
 Personal Affair (1953) – Henry Vining
 Our Girl Friday (1953) – Captain
 Front Page Story (1954) – Black
 Lease of Life (1954) – The Dean
 The Cockleshell Heroes (1955) – Gestapo Comdt.
 Around The World in 80 Days (1956) – Club Member
 The Man in the Sky (1957) – Conway
 Something of Value (1957) – A White Settler – Henry McKenzie
 The Birthday Present (1957) – Sir John Dell
 The Camp on Blood Island (1958) – Cyril Beattie
 Darby O'Gill and the Little People (1959) – Lord Fitzpatrick
 Third Man on the Mountain (1959) – Herr Hempel
 H.M.S. Defiant (1962) – Admiral Jackson
 We Joined the Navy (1962) – Admiral Thomas
 Decision at Midnight (1963) – Prime Minister

Selected stage roles
 Debonair by Frank Vosper (1930)
 Black Coffee by Agatha Christie (1931)
 Someone at the Door by Campbell Christie (1935)
 Poison Pen by Richard Llewellyn (1938)
 Death on the Table by Michael Pertwee (1938)
 The Duke in Darkness by Patrick Hamilton (1942)
 The Green Bay Tree by	Mordaunt Shairp (1950)

References

External links

1896 births
1976 deaths
English male film actors
English male stage actors
English male television actors
People from Harborough District
Male actors from Leicestershire
20th-century English male actors
Alumni of RADA
Male actors from Plymouth, Devon
British Army personnel of World War I
Worcestershire Regiment soldiers
Devonshire Regiment soldiers
Somerset Light Infantry soldiers
Military personnel from Plymouth, Devon